Superbus (Latin for superb, proud, arrogant) may refer to:

 Superbus (band), a French pop-rock band formed in 1999
 18596 Superbus, a Main-belt asteroid discovered on January 21, 1998
 Lucius Tarquinius Superbus (before 535 BC – 496 BC), the seventh and last King of Rome, reigning from 535 until the Roman revolt in 509 BC
 Mount Superbus, the Queensland's third highest peak at 1375 metres (4500 feet)
Several bus industry companies, a play on super bus:
 Superbus (company), an Israeli bus company
 Superbus (transport), a project concerning the creation of high speed buses

See also 
 Superba (disambiguation)